Polka Party could refer to:

 Polka Party!, the fourth studio album by "Weird Al" Yankovic
 "Polka Party!", a polka medley included on the album
 Polka Party with Brave Combo: Live and Wild!, an album by the American polka band Brave Combo